Chloé Willhelm (born 8 July 1989, in Saint-Priest-en-Jarez) is a French competitor in synchronized swimming. In the 2012 Summer Olympics, held in London, United Kingdom, she came tenth in the Women's Duet competition (alongside Sara Labrousse).

References

French synchronized swimmers
Synchronized swimmers at the 2012 Summer Olympics
Olympic synchronized swimmers of France
Living people
1989 births
People from Saint-Priest-en-Jarez
Sportspeople from Loire (department)